SSV Ulm 1846 is a German football club from Ulm, Baden-Württemberg.  The modern-day football department, officially playing as SSV Ulm 1846 Fussball, was formed on 9 March 2009 when the department separated from SSV Ulm 1846.

The club's greatest success has been promotion to the Bundesliga in 1998–99, where it played for just one season. Ulm has also spent eight seasons in the 2. Bundesliga between 1979–80 and 2000–01.

History
The older of the two predecessor sides was founded on 12 April 1846 as Turnerbund Ulm. They had an on-again, off-again relationship with Turnverein Ulm through the 1850s. The football department became independent in 1926 as Ulmer Rasensport Verein and in 1939 would merge with Ulmer Fußball Verein, and their old clubmates in TB Ulm and TV Ulm, to form TSG Ulm 1846. In 1968, RSVgg Ulm became part of TSG Ulm 1846.

1. Schwimm- und Sportverein Ulm was formed in 1928.

TSG Ulm 1846

The football department of Turnerbund Ulm became independent in 1926 as Ulmer Rasensportverein and in 1939 would merge with Ulmer Fußballverein, and their old club mates in TB Ulm and TV Ulm, to form TSG Ulm 1846. Throughout this time the club played in local competition before joining the Gauliga Württemberg, one of sixteen top flight divisions formed in the 1933 reorganisation of German football under the Third Reich, for the 1939–40 season. The club played there until the end of World War II. After the war they began play in the 2. Oberliga Süd (II) and did well enough to make occasional advances to the Oberliga Süd (I) for short stays before falling back again. In 1963, with the formation of the Bundesliga, Germany's new top-flight professional league, TSG Ulm 1846 found itself in the Regionalliga Süd (II) for a couple of seasons before slipping to tier III and IV level play. In 1968, RSVgg Ulm became part of TSG Ulm 1846.

1. SSV Ulm
1. Spiel- und Sportverein Ulm was formed in 1928 and, after two seasons in the Bezirksliga Bayern, joined the Gauliga Württemberg in 1933, well before their future partner, where they earned just mid-table finishes. After the war and leading up to their union with TSG 1846, they played as a third or fourth division side. Finally, in 1970, 1. SSV Ulm merged with TSG 1846 to form SSV Ulm 1846.

SSV Ulm 1846
At the time of the merger. both clubs were playing football in the tier III Amateurliga Württemberg and would continue to do so for a nearly a decade. In 1980, the combined side advanced to the 2. Bundesliga Süd and would spend six of the next ten years playing at that level where, except for a fifth-place finish in 1982, their results were well down the table. After another decade in the level III Amateur Oberliga Baden-Württemberg and Regionalliga Süd, 1846 made an unexpected breakthrough after just one season in the 2. Bundesliga with a third-place finish that led to the club's promotion to the top-flight Bundesliga for the 1999–2000 season. Even though the issue was not decided until the last day of the season, Ulm could do no better than a sixteenth-place finish and returned to the second division. The 2000–01 season was an unqualified disaster for the club: they could manage only another sixteenth-place finish and were sent back down to the Regionalliga Süd (III). They were then denied a licence over the chaotic state of their finances which plunged the club down to the fifth tier Verbandsliga Württemberg. Afterwards Ulm worked their way back, to the Oberliga Baden-Württemberg (IV) in 2002, and the Regionalliga in 2008.

SSV Ulm 1846 Fußball
Following the 2009 European football betting scandal, the club released three allegedly involved players, Davor Kraljević, Marijo Marinović and Dinko Radojević. In January 2011, the club was declared insolvent, and the results of the 2010–11 season were declared void. The club was relegated to the Oberliga Baden-Württemberg but immediately won the 2011–12 title, finishing nine points clear of second-placed VfR Mannheim and earning promotion to the new Regionalliga Südwest.

In May 2014, SSV Ulm 1846 was once again close to insolvency, for the third time in 13 years, requiring €420,000 in financial support before the end of the month to ensure survival. The club eventually entered administration and was relegated back to the Oberliga. After two seasons, SSV Ulm 1846 was promoted to the Regionalliga in May 2016.

Honours

League
 German amateur championship
 Champions: 1996
 Regionalliga Süd (III)
 Champions: 1998
 Oberliga Baden-Württemberg (III/IV/V)
 Champions: 1979, 1982, 1983, 1986, 1993, 1994, 2012, 2016
 Runners-up: 1992, 2003, 2005, 2007, 2008
 Amateurliga Württemberg (III)
 Champions: 1946‡, 1950‡, 1955†, 1972, 1973, 1977, 1978
 Runners-up: 1956†, 1974
 Verbandsliga Württemberg (V)
 Runners-up: 2002

Cup
 Württemberg Cup (Tiers III-VII)
 Winners: 1957†, 1982, 1983, 1992, 1994, 1995, 1997, 2018, 2019, 2020, 2021
 Runners-up: 1976, 1998, 2000¥, 2001¥, 2006, 2007, 2022

 ‡ Won by TSG Ulm 1846.
 † Won by SSV Ulm.
 ¥ Won by reserve team.

Recent managers
Recent managers of the club:

Recent seasons
The recent season-by-season performance of the club:

 With the introduction of the Regionalligas in 1994 and the 3. Liga in 2008 as the new third tier, below the 2. Bundesliga, all leagues below dropped one tier. In 2012, the number of Regionalligas was increased from three to five with all Regionalliga Süd clubs except the Bavarian ones entering the new Regionalliga Südwest.

Key

Current squad
Updated 1 July 2022

Fans and controversies
In the fanscene there are right-wing extremist tendencies and right-wing hooligans. In May 2019, several extremists attacked a Roma family. Four of the perpetrators had connections to the SSV Ulm fan scene. Despite a trial, the perpetrators were initially not banned from the stadium, which is why the club's management was heavily criticized by the Central Council of German Sinti and Roma.

"To ignore this inhuman crime simply stunned us. Imagine if the same incident had occurred against the Jewish minority, then different measures would have been taken by the club´s management. The Holocaust clearly also includes the annihilation of half a million Sinti and Roma in Nazi occupied Europe. And the responsibility of a club management must be the same here." - Romani Rose, Chairman, Central Council of German Sinti and Roma.

In addition, there are group photos on which, among other things, the Nazi salute is shown.

References

External links

Official club website
SSV Ulm 1846 at Weltfussball.de
Das deutsche Fußball-Archiv historical German domestic league tables 

 
Football clubs in Germany
Football clubs in Baden-Württemberg
1846 establishments in Germany
Association football clubs established in 1846
Ulm
Bundesliga clubs
2. Bundesliga clubs
Sport in Tübingen (region)